LeLoup is an unincorporated community in Franklin County, Kansas, United States.  It is located a mile and half north of Interstate 35 on Tennessee Road, 11 miles northeast of Ottawa, 7 miles southwest of Wellsville.

History
LeLoup was founded in 1870 after the Santa Fe Railroad laid tracks through the area. The community was originally named Ferguson after Robert Ferguson, the original owner of the town site. The community was renamed LeLoup after a French traveler got off at Ferguson and mistook a coyote for a wolf and began shouting "le loup", then the community voted to change the name to LeLoup.

LeLoup had a post office from September 1870 until 1954; the name of the post office was changed from Ferguson in 1879.

Gallery

References

Further reading

 Fitzgerald, Daniel. Ghost Towns of Kansas 6. 2009.

External links
 Franklin County maps: Current, Historic, KDOT

Unincorporated communities in Kansas
Unincorporated communities in Franklin County, Kansas